This is a list of active, dormant, and extinct volcanoes in Guatemala.

Volcanoes

See also
 Central America Volcanic Arc
 List of volcanoes in El Salvador
 List of volcanoes in Honduras
 List of volcanoes in Mexico

Footnotes

References 

Guatemala
List
Volcanoes